CitiTrends also known as #CitiTrends is a 30-minute radio show which airs on Citi FM and focuses on technology solutions available in Ghana especially new media in Ghana. It is one of the few radio shows dedicated to technology in Ghana. 

Featured on the show so far are award-winning Fast Company-listed Leti Arts, Wikipedians in Ghana, Facebook's Konstantinos Papamiltiadis, Worldreader, TEDx Accra among others.

References

Radio stations in Ghana
Greater Accra Region
Mass media in Accra